Grigor Dimitrov Nachovich (3 February 1845 – 4 January 1920) was a Bulgarian politician and diplomat. One of the early leaders of the Conservative Party and the country's first Minister of Finance, he served as a minister in a number of Bulgarian governments (including some formed by liberal parties) from the late 1879 to 1900, and was also mayor of Sofia in 1896–1897.

He studied at the Greek-language school in Svishtov, at a French-language college and at economy schools in Paris and Vienna. He graduated in political economy in Paris and returned to Svishtov to work as a merchant. In 1866, he headed the local revolutionary committee aimed at liberating Bulgaria from Ottoman rule.

After Filip Totyu's armed detachment invaded Bulgaria in 1867, Nachovich was forced to flee to Bucharest, Romania, fearing government persecution due to his involvement in the revolutionary movement. In Romania, Nachovich co-operated with the Band of Virtues, a Bulgarian expatriate organisation, and financed volunteer participation in the Belgrade-based Second Bulgarian Legion. In 1868, he settled in Vienna. In the capital of Austria-Hungary, he worked at the local branch of his father's trading company. He founded the literary society Progress (Напредък, Napredak) and contributed to various French and German-language newspapers. During the Serbo-Turkish conflict in 1876, Nachovich aided Bulgarian volunteers who assisted the Serbian forces. For the course of the Russo-Turkish War two years later, Nachovich served at the Russian general staff.

After the Liberation of Bulgaria in the wake of that war and the establishment of the Principality of Bulgaria, Nachovich became a prominent figure in conservative Bulgarian politics. He was minister of finance in the first ever Bulgarian government headed by Todor Burmov as well as three years later (1879 and 1882–1883), minister of external affairs and religion (1879–1880), assistant-mayor of the capital Sofia (1880–1881), minister of internal affairs (1882), and member of the State Council during Prince Alexander Battenberg's personal régime (1881–1883). As the regime ended, Nachovich also headed the ministry of finance during Dragan Tsankov's coalition government (1883–1884). In 1882, he became a correspondent member of what is today the Bulgarian Academy of Sciences; in 1884, he became a full member.

In 1884, Nachovich was appointed Bulgaria's diplomatic representative in Bucharest, Romania, a post he formally held until 1889. After Prince Alexander's dethronement in 1886, Nachovich returned to the country to serve as minister of finance in several governments from 1886 to 1888. From 1889 to 1891, Nachovich represented Bulgaria in Vienna, Austria-Hungary, only to return to Bulgaria as a minister of finance and minister of internal affairs (1891–1892 and 1894–1896), mayor of Sofia (1896–1897) and minister of commerce and agriculture (1899–1900). From 1903 to 1906, Nachovich was Bulgarian diplomatic representative in Istanbul (Tsarigrad), Ottoman Empire. In 1913, he took part in the Treaty of London negotiations during the Balkan Wars.

Grigor Nachovich died in Sofia on 4 January 1920, aged 74.

References

1845 births
1920 deaths
People from Svishtov
Conservative Party (Bulgaria) politicians
People's Party (Bulgaria) politicians
People's Liberal Party politicians
Finance ministers of Bulgaria
Diplomats from Sofia
Mayors of Sofia
Members of the Bulgarian Academy of Sciences
Bulgarian expatriates in Austria
19th-century Bulgarian people